Douglas Hodge is an English actor, director, and musician who has had an extensive career in theatre, as well as television and film where he has appeared in Robin Hood (2010), Legends of Oz: Dorothy's Return and Diana (2013), Penny Dreadful (2016), Catastrophe (2018), Joker and Lost in Space (2019), The Great (2021),

Early life
When he was very young, his family moved to Wigmore, Gillingham, Kent.  He attended Fairview Primary School and The Howard School in Rainham, Kent. He was awarded a position as student at the Royal Academy of Dramatic Art (RADA), in London, but was not happy with the syllabus and left before graduating. This never affected his hunger to be an actor.

Career

Theatre
Hodge has acted in plays by Harold Pinter, including No Man's Land at the Comedy Theatre in February 1993; Moonlight at the Almeida Theatre in September 1993; A Kind of Alaska,The Lover; The Collection at the Donmar Warehouse in May 1998; as Jerry in Betrayal at the Royal National Theatre's Lyttelton Theatre, in November 1998; and as Aston in The Caretaker at the Comedy Theatre in November 2000, co-starring Michael Gambon (Davies) and Rupert Graves (Mick), directed by Patrick Marber – for which he was nominated for an Olivier Award for Best Actor in a Supporting Role. For the National Theatre in May 1994 Hodge played the title role in Phyllida Lloyd's Olivier Theatre staging of Shakespeare's Pericles and Al in Stephen Poliakoff's Blinded by the Sun directed by Ron Daniels at the Cottesloe Theatre in May 1997.

In 2002, Hodge played Leontes in an RSC revival of The Winter's Tale at the Roundhouse. In April 2003 he portrayed Andrei in Michael Blakemore's revival of Chekhov's Three Sisters at the Playhouse Theatre. In 2004, he made his Royal Court debut as Barry in Joe Penhall's study of entrapment journalism Dumb Show, directed by Terry Johnson. Hodge's directorial debut came in 2004, at the Oxford Playhouse in a double bill of The Dumb Waiter and Other Pieces. Hodge appeared in the 2005 revival of Guys and Dolls at the Piccadilly Theatre playing Nathan Detroit opposite Ewan McGregor playing Sky Masterson. He received an Olivier Award nomination for his performance.

During the summer of 2006, he acted the title role in Titus Andronicus, at Shakespeare's Globe. Simultaneously, he made his West End directorial debut with See How They Run, a 1940s wartime farce by Philip King, preceded by a UK tour. When his production opened in the West End, Nancy Carroll took over from Hattie Morahan in the role of the vicar's young wife. In May 2007 he displayed a lyric tenor voice as Frank, the neurosurgeon in A Matter of Life and Death with the Kneehigh Theatre company at the National Theatre, a production with music, based on events in the film of the same name. Also in 2007 he guest starred in the Doctor Who audio dramas Urban Myths and Son of the Dragon. In 2008, Hodge starred as Albin in the London revival of La Cage aux Folles which played originally at the Menier Chocolate Factory. He later reprised this role at the Playhouse Theatre in the West End and won the 2009 Olivier Award for Best Actor in a Musical.

In 2010, The London production of La Cage aux Folles transferred to Broadway, at the Longacre Theatre, with Hodge as Albin, and Kelsey Grammer as Georges. Hodge won the 2010 Tony Award for Best Performance by a Leading Actor in a Musical for his performance. A 2011 revival of John Osborne's Inadmissible Evidence at the Donmar Theatre, London, offered Hodge another role, as Maitland, the lawyer in crisis. Hodge received an Olivier Award nomination for his performance. In 2012, Hodge returned to Broadway when he starred as Cyrano de Bergerac in the Roundabout Theatre Company's revival of Cyrano de Bergerac at the American Airlines Theatre. In October 2012, Hodge was cast as Willy Wonka in the musical Charlie and the Chocolate Factory the Musical at the Theatre Royal, Drury Lane London.

In 2015, Hodge made his debut as a Broadway director, helming a revival of Pinter's 1971 play Old Times, which starred Clive Owen, Eve Best and Kelly Reilly, and opened at the American Airlines Theatre.

Writing 
Hodge wrote a musical with Aschlin Ditta, temporarily called Meantime. Josefina Gabrielle, Denis Lawson and several others participated in a cast recording, and actors including Rory Kinnear, Indira Varma and Cillian Murphy participated in a reading of the book.

He wrote the music and lyrics for the musical 101 Dalmatians, based on the novel by Dodie Smith with a book by Johnny McKnight (from a stage adaptation by Zinnie Harris) at the Regent's Park Open Air Theatre. The musical was due to open in May 2020, however was postponed to July 2022 due to the COVID-19 pandemic.

Directing
Hodge has parallel careers as a writer, director and composer, most recently directing Torch Song Trilogy at the Menier Chocolate Factory in 2012. He was Associate Director at the Donmar Theatre directing Dimetos in 2009, Absurdia in 2007.

He directed the world premiere of Last Easter by Bryony Lavery at Birmingham Repertory Theatre, and See How They Run.

Awards
Hodge has received Olivier Award nominations for Best Actor for Inadmissible Evidence in 2012 and Best Actor in a Musical for Guys and Dolls in 2006, winning Best Actor in a Musical for La Cage aux Folles in 2010. He was also nominated for Best Actor in the 2005 Evening Standard Awards for his role in Dumbshow at the Royal Court.

Douglas starred as Albin in the Broadway transfer of La Cage aux Folles, for which his performance won him a Tony Award for Best Actor in a Musical, a Drama Desk Award for Outstanding Actor in a Musical, and an Outer Critics Circle Award for Outstanding Actor in a Musical. He originally played the role in London in 2008 at the Menier Chocolate Factory and then at the Playhouse Theatre in the West End.

Television
With Peter Searles, Hodge co-wrote Pacha Mama's Blessing and Forest People, about the Amazon Rainforest, performed by the National Youth Theatre on BBC Television in 1989. He appeared in the BBC's production Middlemarch, adapted by Andrew Davies from the novel by George Eliot and directed by Anthony Page. In the US it aired on Masterpiece Theatre in 1994.

His other TV appearances include leading roles in Behaving Badly (1989); Capital City (1989–1990); A Fatal Inversion (1992); Bliss (1995); Only Fools and Horses (1996) The Uninvited (1997); The Scold's Bridle (1998); Shockers: Dance (1999); The Law (2000); the BBC serial adaptation of Trollope's The Way We Live Now (2001), as Roger Carbury; The Russian Bride (2001); Red Cap (2003–2004); Spooks (2005); ITV's 2007 adaptation of Mansfield Park, as Sir Thomas Bertram; and the made-for-TV film Lift, directed by James Hawes, a 2007 Hartswood Films production for BBC Four, as Paul Sykes, "a constantly exasperated, highly-strung middle-aged businessman with commitments.".

In 2010, he appeared in the episode "The Restaurant" of the third series of the BBC sitcom Outnumbered as Brick Bolenger, an American therapist who is married to Auntie Angela (played by Samantha Bond). The character was involved in a story line of the fourth series in 2011, but never appeared on screen. In 2012, Hodge had a role in the BBC drama One Night, as well as appearing in the conspiracy thriller miniseries Secret State, and the ITV-1 drama The Town.

In 2016 he featured as Rex Mayhew in the BBC adaptation of John le Carré's The Night Manager. In 2017, he appeared in "Black Museum", an episode of the anthology series Black Mirror. He appeared as Inspector Bartholomew Rusk in the series Penny Dreadful.

In 2021, Hodge played the role of General Velementov, head of Catherine the Great's armies in The Great, alongside Elle Fanning and Nicholas Hoult.

Music
Doug Hodge released two albums of his own compositions: "Cowley Road Songs" in 2005, and "Nightbus" in 2009. He won the Stiles and Drewe 2012 Best New Song Award for his song 'Powercut' from "Meantime", the musical he co-wrote with Aschlin Ditta.

"I've been writing songs all my life but — apart from the occasional girlfriend late at night — I'd never sung them to anyone. Then last year I finally started playing at various venues in and around Oxford. Each time I wrote a new song I'd go down the Ex [on Cowley Road] and sing it... Then Rightback Records asked me to record them. We went into the Blue Moon Studios in Banbury for just four days. This [Cowley Road Songs] is what we came out with..." – Douglas Hodge

Personal life
Hodge was born in Plymouth, Devon. Until 2013 he was in a relationship with actress Tessa Peake-Jones, with whom he has two children. He subsequently married American wigmaker Amanda Miller.

Filmography

Film

Television

Awards and nominations

References

External links

Qvoice Profile

Living people
People educated at The Howard School
Alumni of RADA
Drama Desk Award winners
English dramatists and playwrights
English film directors
English male dramatists and playwrights
English male film actors
English male musical theatre actors
English male Shakespearean actors
English male singer-songwriters
English male stage actors
English male television actors
English theatre directors
Laurence Olivier Award winners
Male actors from Kent
Male actors from Plymouth, Devon
Musicians from Devon
Musicians from Kent
National Youth Theatre members
Tony Award winners
Royal Shakespeare Company members
Year of birth missing (living people)